Fibromuscular Dysplasia Society of America is an American health charity that deals with fibromuscular dysplasia, a vascular disease.

The society sponsors a registry of patients with fibromuscular dysplasia.

References

External links

Health charities in the United States
Medical and health organizations based in Ohio